"If You Believe" is the second single from Chantay Savage's debut album, Here We Go.... The song was originally released independently on ID Records. It was later included on her album and appeared in the 1995 film, Party Girl.

Track listing
UK CD Single
1.) If You Believe (Steve "Silk" Hurley's 7" Mix) [4:02]
2.) If You Believe (E Smoove's 7" Mix) [4:12]
3.) If You Believe (E Smoove's 13 Minute Believer Mix) [13:03]
4.) If You Believe (Believe In Steve's Club Mix) [7:35]
5.) If You Believe (Hurley's Believable Dub) [4:20]
6.) If You Believe (Steve's Dub Instrumental Mix) [4:20]

US Promo CD
1.) If You Believe (E-Smoove Radio Version) [4:12]
2.) If You Believe (E-Smoove Extended Mix) [5:29]
3.) If You Believe (E-Smoove Radio Version w/o Rap) [3:24]

Chart positions

References

Chantay Savage songs
1993 songs
1993 singles
Songs written by Eric Miller (musician)
Songs written by Chantay Savage
RCA Records singles